Mauck is an unincorporated community in Page County, in the U.S. state of Virginia.

References

Unincorporated communities in Virginia
Unincorporated communities in Page County, Virginia